Vikram Harsh Kumar (born 21 January 1981) is an English former first-class cricketer.

Kumar was born in January 1981 at Beckenham. He was educated at Dulwich College, before going up to St John's College, Cambridge. He played first-class cricket while at Cambridge for Cambridge University and Cambridge UCCE, with his debut in first-class cricket coming for the latter their inaugural first-class match against Kent. Kumar played first-class until 2003, making nine appearances for Cambridge UCCE and three appearances for Cambridge University against Oxford University in The University Matches of 2001, 2002 and 2003. Playing as a wicket-keeper, he scored 329 runs for Cambridge UCCE and 156 runs for Cambridge University, with Kumar recording two half centuries for both sides, with his high score of 86 not out for Cambridge UCCE. Behind the stumps he took 8 catches and made a single stumping.

Notes and references

External links

1981 births
Living people
Alumni of St John's College, Cambridge
British sportspeople of Indian descent
British Asian cricketers
Cambridge MCCU cricketers
Cambridge University cricketers
Cricketers from Beckenham
English cricketers
People educated at Dulwich College